Fujian (18), named after Fujian province, is the first of the Type 003 class aircraft carriers (NATO/OSD Fujian-class CV), and is currently fitting out. Built for the People's Liberation Army Navy (PLAN), Fujian was launched on 17 June 2022, and is China’s first fixed-wing aircraft carrier with a fully indigenous design, featuring a CATOBAR system and electromagnetic catapults.

The Type 003 class was originally unofficially called Type 002 when , China's then-incomplete second carrier, was believed to be designated Type 001A. Shandongs official designation, Type 002, was revealed during commissioning. Observers hence believed the third carrier will be the Type 003.

Design
The Type 003 is expected to use steam turbines and electromagnetic catapults, whereas preceding Chinese carriers launched aircraft with ski jumps.

According to Chinese military commentator Song Zhongping, Fujian has integrated electric propulsion (IEP).

The carrier's size is expected to be between the unfinished 85,000-ton  and the United States Navy's 100,000-ton supercarriers. Renewed assessment indicated that its length was 316 meters and has a flight deck with a width of 76 meters. Comparisons have also been drawn to the American s. Earlier press reports and Chinese media generally suggested that the ship might have a displacement of around 80,000 tons to 85,000 tons. Later assessments, backed by satellite images, suggested the displacement was underestimated, and the Type 003 carrier might be closer in displacement to about 100,000 tons. In 2019, Analyst Robert Farley believed that the Type 003 would be the "largest and most advanced aircraft carrier ever built outside the United States."

Development
The Type 003 was originally intended to use steam-powered catapults. In 2013, PLAN Rear Admiral Yin Zhuo said that China's next aircraft carrier would be equipped with an electromagnetic launch system. Multiple prototypes were spotted by media in 2012, and aircraft capable of using the system were tested at naval research facilities. The change to electromagnetic (EM) catapults likely explains the increase in size from previous Chinese carriers.

Construction began in the mid-2010s. The exact date is not known; The National Interest reported March 2015; The Diplomat reported that "initial work" had begun in February 2016, followed by a notice to proceed given to the Shanghai Jiangnan Shipyard Group in March 2017. Works were reportedly delayed in June 2017 by electromagnetic and steam catapult tests. By November 2017, the Navy had reportedly developed an IEP system to power electromagnetic catapults, allowing work on the Type 003 to resume.

The block modules were moved from the manufacturing facility to the staging area in May 2020, and into dry dock in July 2020. Almost all of the keel and base hull blocks were in the dock by early September 2020 although the foremost part of the bow was missing. In mid-2020, anonymous Chinese sources projected a launch in the first half of 2022. In September 2020, Rick Joe of The Diplomat projected a launch in mid-2022 at the earliest.

In July 2021, satellite pictures showed that construction was moving ahead, with key elements such as the superstructure and three catapult launch systems being added to the hull. On 10 November, Bloomberg reported that "China is three to six months away from launching its third aircraft carrier", citing a report by the Center for Strategic and International Studies.

The aircraft carrier, named Fujian, was launched with the hull number 18 on 17 June 2022. This name received scrutiny in Western media as its namesake Fujian province is located opposite Taiwan across the strait. However, a PLA Navy spokesperson explained that Chinese aircraft carriers are named after provinces, as per PLAN vessel naming regulations. Previous Chinese aircraft carriers, Liaoning and Shandong, are also named after provinces of China.

The third carrier is expected to have an expanded carrier air wing. In September 2016, a CATOBAR launch prototype of the J-15 fighter was spotted in Shenyang Aircraft Corporation (SAC). A ground-based test facility was built to simulate aircraft catapult operation for the third carrier. In 2018, defense analyst Kyle Mizokami predicted the carrier would operate an air group of 40 fighter aircraft, plus propeller-powered transport and airborne early warning and control (AEW&C) aircraft. In 2020, the KJ-600 carrier-based AEW&C aircraft began test flights.

In 2021, analysts reported that the third carrier will operate the Shenyang J-15B variant, featuring CATOBAR launch capability, modern fifth-generation avionics, active electronically scanned array (AESA) radar, new airframes, stealth coatings, new engines with possible thrust-vectoring capability, and compatibility to launch PL-10 and PL-15 missiles. The J-15B is viewed as an interim carrier-based fighter until a dedicated fifth-generation successor enters service.

See also 
 Chinese aircraft carrier programme

References

2022 ships
Aircraft carriers of the People's Liberation Army Navy